Woolgarlo is a locality on the foreshores of the Yass River arm of Lake Burrinjuck, in the far eastern part of the Riverina in the Yass Valley Shire of New South Wales, Australia.

Location and features

The property was converted into a caravan and camping park during the 1960s, catering mainly to freshwater anglers and waterskiers. The caravan park was renamed Lake Burrinjuck Leisure Resort during the 1980s, but continues to be known as Woolgarlo among locals.

A Woolgarlo Post Office opened on 1 May 1870 but was closed in 1872.

References

Towns in the Riverina
Towns in New South Wales
Southern Tablelands
Yass Valley Council